Port Adelaide Rugby Union Football Club, also known as The Pirates, is a rugby union club in Adelaide, South Australia. The team was founded in 1933. They play at Riverside Oval in black and white hooped jerseys.

History 
The Port Adelaide Rugby Club was formed in 1933 to play in the South Australian Rugby Union competition, as reported in Adelaide's newspaper, The Advertiser:

Since its inception, the club has won the 1st Division premiership twice. Port Adelaide's first premiership, won in an undefeated 12-match season in 1946, was regarded as "unofficial" as no full-strength competition was conducted during World War 2. However, in 2002, Port Adelaide won the grand final 27–16 against Old Collegians to claim the official premiership.

Port Adelaide Rugby Union Football Club is the only club affiliated with all navy ships and they regularly play friendly matches against visiting Australian and Foreign ships.

References
 

Rugby union teams in South Australia
Sporting clubs in Adelaide
Rugby clubs established in 1933
1933 establishments in Australia